Shannon W. Boettcher is a Professor in the Department of Chemistry and Biochemistry at the University of Oregon. His research is at the intersection of materials science and electrochemistry, with a focus on fundamental aspects of energy conversion and storage. He has been named a DuPont Young Professor, a Cottrell Scholar, a Sloan Fellow, and a Camille-Dreyfus Teacher-Scholar. He is a ISI highly cited researcher (top 0.1% over past decade). In 2019, he founded the Oregon Center for Electrochemistry and in 2020 launched the nation’s first targeted graduate program in electrochemical technology. In 2021 he was named a Blavatnik National Award Finalist.

   

Boettcher performed his undergraduate work at the University of Oregon performing research with Prof. Mark Lonergan on electronically conductive ionomers and conjugated-polymer/semiconductor interfaces. His PhD work (2003-2008) in inorganic materials chemistry was at the University of California, Santa Barbara with Prof. Galen Stucky where he was a National Science Foundation Graduate Research Fellow and a UC Chancellors Fellow. His work spanned the synthesis and study of porous transition metal oxides, photoelectrochemistry, and detailed studies of nanoparticle film electrochemistry and nanoparticle/semiconductor interfaces. Boettcher completed postdoctoral work at the California Institute of Technology as a Kavli Nanoscience Institute Prize Postdoctoral Fellow working with Prof. Nathan Lewis (Chemistry) and Prof. Harry Atwater (Applied Physics) studying three-dimensional semiconductor architectures for solar photoelectrochemical and photovoltaic applications. He started as an assistant professor at the University of Oregon in 2010. In the spring of 2012, a profile appeared on Boettcher's work, his background, and perspective in 'The Oregon Quarterly'.

References 

Living people
Year of birth missing (living people)
American chemists
University of Oregon faculty
University of Oregon alumni
California Institute of Technology alumni